Gobstoppers, also known as jawbreakers in the United States, are a type of hard candy.

The term gobstopper derives from "gob", which is slang in the United Kingdom and Ireland for mouth. The sweet was a favourite among British schoolboys in the first half of the twentieth century—author Roald Dahl, who wrote about a jar of gobstoppers featuring in the prank he played in his local sweet shop in 1923, also referred to them in his fictional Everlasting Gobstopper which was featured in his 1964 children's novel Charlie and the Chocolate Factory.

Gobstoppers usually consist of a number of layers, each layer dissolving to reveal a differently coloured (and sometimes differently flavoured) layer, before dissolving completely. Gobstoppers are too hard to bite without risking dental damage (hence the name "jawbreaker").

Gobstoppers have been sold in traditional sweet shops for at least a century, often sold by weight from jars. As gobstoppers dissolve very slowly, they last a very long time in the mouth, which is a major factor in their popularity.

Manufacturing

Gobstoppers are made by slowly depositing layers onto a core (such as a pressed ball of sugar, a single seed of anise or a gumball). Gobstoppers are made in large, rotating, heated pans in a process known as "hot panning". The candies take several weeks to manufacture, as the process of adding liquid sugar is repeated multiple times. Natural and artificial colours and flavours are also added during the panning process.

Everlasting Gobstoppers

The Everlasting Gobstoppers, sold under Nestlé's Willy Wonka Candy Company brand, were first introduced in 1976 by Breaker Confections, and are named after the Everlasting Gobstoppers in Roald Dahl's children's book Charlie and the Chocolate Factory. In Dahl's story, Everlasting Gobstoppers are purported to last forever. Dahl named the sweet after gobstoppers, which were a favourite among British schoolboys between the two World Wars. A jar of gobstoppers featured in the prank Dahl played on the owner of his local sweet shop in 1924, which he recorded in his autobiography Boy: Tales of Childhood.

In popular culture

Charlie and the Chocolate Factory
In the 1964 children's book Charlie and the Chocolate Factory, British author Roald Dahl described "Everlasting Gobstoppers," a fictional gobstopper that could never get smaller or be finished.

Ed, Edd n Eddy
In the animated series Ed, Edd n Eddy, jawbreakers are humongous, and the entire show revolves around them. Most episodes feature the titular main characters running a variety of scams to earn money to buy jawbreakers. They are also the main subject of the video game adaptation Ed, Edd n Eddy: Jawbreakers!

Happy Tree Friends
In the animated television series Happy Tree Friends, Nutty attempts to eat a jawbreaker, but he ends up breaking his jaw trying to bite it in half, and it's indestructible, unbreakable and stone-harded candy, from the episode "Chew Said a Mouthful".

Jawbreaker
The 1999 American teen black comedy Jawbreaker centers around the main characters accidentally killing their friend after gagging her with a jawbreaker.

Notable incidents

In 2003, Taquandra Diggs, a nine-year-old girl in Starke, Florida, suffered severe burns, allegedly from biting on an exploding Wonka Everlasting Gobstopper that had been refrigerated, left out in the sun, then refrigerated again. Diggs and several other alleged victims' families filed lawsuits against Nestlé for medical bills resulting from plastic surgery as well as pain and suffering; the matters were later settled outside of court for an undisclosed amount.

See also
 Aniseed ball
 Atomic Fireball
 Benne ball
 Humbug
 Lemonheads

References

External links

 British confectionery
 British inventions
 Candy